The Lambkin and the Little Fish is a German fairy tale collected by the Brothers Grimm, tale number 141.

It is Aarne-Thompson type 450, the brother and sister; another tale of this type is Brother and Sister.

Synopsis

A brother and sister had a stepmother who hated them.  One day, they were playing a counting-out game in a meadow by a pool, and their stepmother turned the boy into a fish and the girl into a lamb.  Then guests came, and the stepmother ordered the cook to serve the lamb.  The lamb and fish lamented their fates to each other, and the cook served another animal and gave the lamb to a good peasant woman, who had been the girl's nurse.  She suspected who the lamb was, and brought her to a wise woman.  This wise woman pronounced a blessing over the lamb and fish, restoring their human forms, and gave them a little hut in the woods, where they lived happily.

See also
 The Golden Stag (fairy tale)

References

External links
The Little Lamb and the Little Fish

Lambkin and the Little Fish
Lambkin and the Little Fish
Lambkin and the Little Fish
Lambkin and the Little Fish
Lambkin and the Little Fish
Lambkin and the Little Fish
Lambkin and the Little Fish
ATU 400-459